François Bonnemer was a French painter and engraver who was born at Falaise in 1637. He worked with Monier, the younger Corneille, and the younger Vouet on the ceiling of the gallery of the King's Audience Chamber at the Tuileries, and was commissioned by the king to copy some works of Carracci in the Farnese Gallery at Rome. He engraved several plates after Le Brun, and was the master of Ménageot. He died in Paris in 1689.

References
 

1637 births
1689 deaths
People from Falaise, Calvados
17th-century French engravers
17th-century French painters
French male painters